Guibourtia tessmannii is a species of legume in the family Fabaceae. It is a medium to large-sized tree and is native to Cameroon, Gabon and Equatorial Guinea. The timber has an attractive appearance and has many uses, and the bark is used in traditional medicine.

Description
The trunk is straight and cylindrical, often with tall slender buttresses. The greyish or brownish bark has circular scaly patches which become detached, leaving orange depressions. The inflorescence is a terminal or axillary panicle with thick stems clad in red hairs. The flowers are small, whitish and fragrant, with four sepals, no petals, ten stamens and a superior ovary.

Distribution and habitat
This tree is found in primary evergreen forests in Cameroon, Gabon and Equatorial Guinea.

Uses
The wood of G. tessmannii is dense, hard and durable, the heartwood being reddish-brown with purplish streaking. The timber is harvested from the wild and sold under the trade name "bubinga". It is used for house construction as beams, joists, flooring, panelling and for other purposes. It is also used for making high-quality furniture, plywood, turning, containers, musical instruments and handicrafts. The wood has an attractive appearance and is often used for veneers.

The bark is much esteemed in traditional medicine and is often removed from living trees; it is sold at the markets of Yaoundé, Cameroon. A concoction of the bark is used to treat hypertension and gonorrhea, to prevent abortion, as an anthelmintic and to clean wounds. Various other claims are made for the bark including activity against typhoid fever and many other conditions. Another use is as a fungicide for controlling black pod disease in cocoa trees. The seeds are eaten by hornbills, monkeys and chimpanzees and these may serve to disperse the seed.

References

tessmannii
Trees of Africa
Flora of West-Central Tropical Africa